Tanderagee railway station was opened on 6 January 1852. It was originally named Madden Bridge and was located on the Madden road between the villages of Tandragee, County Armagh and Gilford, County Down, Northern Ireland. It closed on 4 January 1965.

Tanderagee is also spelt as Tandragee, after the nearby village. Tanderagee and Gilford railway station was the original name upon opening of the station.

Only the two platforms remain, the station buildings having been demolished.

References

Disused railway stations in County Armagh
Railway stations opened in 1852
1852 establishments in Ireland
Railway stations in Northern Ireland opened in the 19th century